The Saint Thaddeus Church, is an Armenian Apostolic church in the town of Masis, Ararat Province, Armenia.

History 
The construction site of the Church was chosen by Vazgen I, the Catholicos of All Armenians, in 1991 and the ground blessing service was conducted in the same year. The construction started in 2003 by the initiative and funding of benefactor Hrant Vardanyan. In 2015, the construction of the Church was completed by his sons, Mikayel and Karen Vardanyans.

The Church, built with the blessing of Vazgen I, the Catholicos of All Armenians, was named after the Apostle St. Thaddeus. 
On October 4, 2015, the Catholicos of All Armenians Karekin II, consecrated the Saint Thaddeus Church. 
The hall for candle lighting is located at the entrance of the Church. A memorial fountain dedicated to Hrant Vardanyan, is installed in the yard of the Church.
On April 24, 2016, by the initiative of benefactors Mikayel and Karen Vardanyans, a khachkar (also known as an Armenian cross-stone) was placed in the yard of the Church, in honor of the 1,5 million canonized martyrs of the Armenian Genocide. The Khachkar was carved of a whole tuff stone (sculptor: Artak Hambardzumyan).

Architecture 
The architects of St. Thaddeus Church are Artur and Anahit Tarkhanyans. It is a combination of Armenian church building traditions, and contemporary architectural and construction solutions. The church is triple-stepped, and differs by its design and spatial solutions. The internal space is shaped by two intersecting squares, which symbolize eternity and purity of faith, and through the latter the whole structural system is constructed. The dome is rested on semi crossing arches. The external and internal cladding of the Church is unique. The colors from the center to the edges become lighter, and from the base to the dome – darker. The height of the temple, without the cross on the dome, is 33 meters, which symbolizes the years of Jesus Christ’s life on earth. Thirty-three biblical commandments are engraved on the entire wall surrounding the Church.

See also 

 Apostle Thaddeus
 St. Thaddeus Monastery

Gallery

References

External links 
 Mikayel and Karen Vardanyans sponsored the instalment of the cross-stone in the courtyard of St. Thaddeus church
 Anahit Tarkhanyan: The newly consecrated St. Thaddeus church in Masis was built using a unique architectural technique
 RA President Serzh Sargsyan was present at the consecration of the newly built church in Masis
 The project initiated by Hrant Vardanyan is completed

Armenian Apostolic churches in Armenia
21st-century Oriental Orthodox church buildings
21st-century churches in Armenia
Churches completed in 2015